B is a compilation album of b-sides, rare recordings and unreleased material from English rock band I Am Kloot.

The album was first released at gigs starting on 16 September 2009, and was available on 15 October via Townsend Records.  The official release date was 2 November 2009. The cover art consisted of fan-submitted artwork featuring the letter B.

Track listing 
The track listing for the album is as follows:

Disc 1

Disc 2

Bonus tracks 
Bonus tracks on the "European" 2xCD release and on the 2xLP release:

Track origins 
Track 1 originally released on "Titanic/To You" 7" single 
Tracks 2, 27 originally released on "Morning Rain" single 
Tracks 3, 4 originally released on "Life in a Day" CD single 1 
Tracks 5, 13 originally released on "Life in a Day" CD single 2 
Track 6 originally released on "Untitled #1" 7" single 
Track 7 originally scheduled for release on "I Believe" single
Track 8 originally released on "Maybe I Should" single
Track 9, 10, 22 originally released on "Over My Shoulder" single
Track 11, 12 originally release on "3 Feet Tall" single
Tracks 14, 15, 16, 17, 19, 21, 23, 28 previously unreleased on any format
Track 18 original version appears on I Am Kloot Play Moolah Rouge
Track 20 released as free download from I Am Kloot website in Christmas 2008
Track 24 originally released on "From Your Favourite Sky" single
Track 25 originally released on We Love You, So Love Us Too compilation

Tracks 4, 9, 13, 15, 19 and 22 all pre-date I Am Kloot and were originally performed by singer John Bramwell under the name Johnny Dangerously.

Personnel 
 John Harold Arnold Bramwell – vocals, guitars.
 Peter Jobson – bass, slide guitar, backing vocals, piano, organ.
 Andy Hargreaves – drums, percussion, glockenspiel.

References 

2009 albums
I Am Kloot albums